Václav Tille (16 February 1867 in Tábor – 26 June 1937 in Prague) was a Czech writer. He also used the pseudonym Václav Říha.

External links

 
  

1867 births
1937 deaths
Czech male writers
Literary theorists
People from Tábor